Kenneth Rosenberg (born July 9, 1995) is an American professional baseball pitcher in the Los Angeles Angels organization. He played college baseball for California State University, Northridge. Rosenberg was drafted by the Tampa Bay Rays in the 8th round of the 2016 Major League Baseball draft, and made his MLB debut in 2022.

Amateur career
Rosenberg was born in Mill Valley, California, a small town north of San Francisco, later lived in Santa Clarita, California, and is Jewish. He attended Tamalpais High School, where he was an All-MCAL First Team pitcher and first baseman in baseball in 2013, as well as an All-League goalkeeper in soccer. As a senior, on the mound Rosenberg had 75 strikeouts in 49 innings, with two shutouts.

He then attended California State University, Northridge, majoring in journalism. In his sophomore season in 2016, he posted a 6–1 record with a 3.21 earned run average (ERA) and led the Big West Conference with 118 strikeouts (in 109 innings), ahead of eventual Cy Young Award winner Shane Bieber, as he held batters to a .198 batting average. He was named Big West Conference All-Academic Team.

Professional career

Tampa Bay Rays organization
Rosenberg was drafted by the Tampa Bay Rays in the 8th round of the 2016 Major League Baseball draft. In 2016, between the Rookie GCL Rays and Princeton Rays, he went 1–2 with a 2.54 ERA. 

In 2017, Rosenberg pitched for the Class A Bowling Green Hot Rods. He went 7-7 with one save and a 4.28 ERA, and his 133 strikeouts ranked third in the Midwest League and fourth in the Rays organization. 

In 2018, Rosenberg pitched for the Charlotte Stone Crabs of the Class A Florida State League. He went 11-2 with a 4.86 ERA, as his 11 wins ranked third in the league, his 106 strikeouts were sixth, and his .846 winning percentage was eighth. 

In 2019, Rosenberg pitched primarily for the Double A Montgomery Biscuits, also pitching in one game for the Triple A Durham Bulls. He went 11-4 with a 3.29 ERA in 25 games (16 starts) for Montgomery, and was named a midseason Southern League All Star. He tied for the league lead in wins, ranked fourth in ERA, and ninth in strikeouts with 108. His aggregate 114 strikeouts were third among Rays minor leaguers. He did not play in 2020 since the minor league season was cancelled due to the COVID-19 pandemic. 

The Rays invited Rosenberg to spring training in 2021. He split the 2021 season between the FCL Rays, Montgomery, and Durham, going a combined 4-1 with a 2.81 ERA over 41.2 innings.

Los Angeles Angels
On December 8, 2021, Rosenberg was selected by the Los Angeles Angels with the 8th pick in the minor league phase of the 2021 Rule 5 draft.

Rosenberg opened the 2022 season with the Salt Lake Bees. On April 18, the Angels selected his contract and promoted him to the major leagues for the first time. He made his MLB debut that day, surrendering a run in relief against the Houston Astros while striking out two. The following day, the Angels optioned Rosenberg back to Salt Lake. Rosenberg was recalled by the Angels on May 31 and made his second career major league appearance that day, throwing 99 pitches in 5 innings of relief against the New York Yankees. On June 19, 2022, Rosenberg made his first career start, pitching  scoreless innings against the Seattle Mariners. In 2022 with the Salt Lake Bees, he was 2-5 with a 3.16 ERA (tied for 9th in the PCL) in 14 games (13 starts) covering 62.2 innings in which he struck out 60 batters. He was designated for assignment on December 12, 2022.

See also

List of select Jewish baseball players
Rule 5 draft results

References

External links

1995 births
Living people
People from Mill Valley, California
Baseball players from California
Major League Baseball pitchers
Los Angeles Angels players
Cal State Northridge Matadors baseball players
Gulf Coast Rays players
Florida Complex League Rays players
Princeton Rays players
Bowling Green Hot Rods players
Charlotte Stone Crabs players
Montgomery Biscuits players
Durham Bulls players
Salt Lake Bees players